In New Zealand, waka-jumping is a colloquial term for when a member of Parliament (MP) switches political party between elections, taking their parliamentary seat with them and potentially upsetting electoral proportionality in the New Zealand Parliament. In 2001 legislation was enacted that required list MPs to leave Parliament if they waka-jumped; this law expired after the 2005 election. In 2018 a similar law was passed which requires a defecting MP to give up their seat on the request of their former party leader. Electorate MPs may re-contest their seat in a by-election, whereas list MPs are replaced by the next available person on the party list.

Waka is a Māori language word that originally meant a large Māori canoe (although it can also mean any other vehicle). Hence, the term waka-jumping is a variant of the seafaring term "" – to leave a ship's crew abruptly and against the terms of a fixed-term contract (or naval enlistment). To a lesser degree, it is connected to waka hurdling: a traditional Maori sport, in which competitors jump canoes over suspended logs.

Legislation 
The implementation of the mixed-member proportional (MMP) electoral system after a referendum in 1993 led to a series of defections and re-alignments as the former two-party system adjusted to the change. This led to the rise and fall of a number of political parties in New Zealand, including the creation of New Zealand First and ACT. The new political climate tended to favour the establishment of new political parties since in former times, dissidents had often simply become independent MPs. In the two previous parliaments before the 2001 Act had been passed, 22 MPs defected.

Electoral (Integrity) Amendment Act 2001

The frequency of waka-jumping made New Zealand enact the Electoral (Integrity) Amendment Act 2001, which had been introduced by Labour Party associate justice minister Margaret Wilson in 1999 but had been promoted by Labour's coalition partner Alliance ahead of that year's general election. The Act expired at the 2005 election, when the sunset clause came into effect. It required MPs who had entered Parliament via a party list to resign from Parliament if they left that party's parliamentary caucus.

However, parties were still able to find ways around this law. When the Alliance split in 2002 over how to respond to the invasion of Afghanistan, Jim Anderton nominally remained the leader of the Alliance inside Parliament while he campaigned outside Parliament as the leader of the newly-founded Progressive Party. The resulting uncertainty around the Alliance’s position contributed to Prime Minister Helen Clark's decision to call an early general election in 2002. While the law was in force, it was used once to expel a list MP from Parliament (an electorate MP who changed parties could still fight a by-election, as Tariana Turia did).

In December 2003, the ACT Party caucus voted to expel Donna Awatere Huata, an ACT list MP who became an independent after she had been charged with fraud. The expulsion became the subject of litigation, and Awatere Huata was not expelled from Parliament until a Supreme Court decision handed down in November 2004. A proposed Bill to replace the Act in 2005 failed.

Electoral (Integrity) Amendment Act 2018 and repeal attempt
The Electoral (Integrity) Amendment Act 2018 received Royal Assent on 3 October 2018 and entered into force in New Zealand the next day. The provisions on waka-jumping now appear as section 55A of the Electoral Act 1993. Under those provisions, members of Parliament who choose to leave their party or are expelled from their party are also expelled from Parliament if the leader of the party under which they were elected issues appropriate notice to the Speaker that the MP should be expelled, with the seat becoming vacant. Unlike the 2001 Act, the 2018 Act did not have a sunset clause and so remains in force until it is deliberately repealed. The Act was passed as part of the coalition agreement between New Zealand First and the Labour Party and supported through Parliament "begrudgingly" by the Green Party under the terms of its own confidence-and-supply agreement with Labour.

A member's bill in the name of National Party MP David Carter with the intent of repealing the Electoral (Integrity) Amendment Act 2018 was introduced into Parliament in July 2020. The Green Party defied other government parties to support the repeal bill, with the first reading in Parliament passing by 64 to 55 votes. Carter's Electoral (Integrity Repeal) Amendment Bill was then referred to the justice select committee. After the 2020 New Zealand general election, the bill's second reading was held on 12 May and 14 June 2021, and the Labour Party used its majority of 65 seats to block its passage.

List of waka-jumpers

Below is a list of notable waka-jumpers:

MMP era

Historic waka-jumpers

See also
 Aaya Ram Gaya Ram
 Anti-defection law (India)
 Crossing the floor
 Party switching

Notes 
1.After becoming an Independent politician, Peters successfully contested a by-election in his Tauranga electorate.
2.After switching to the Maori Party, Turia had to contest a by-election, in line with the ban on waka-jumping then in force. She won the resulting contest in Te Tai Hauauru.
3.After crossing to the Mana Movement, Harawira successfully contested a by-election in his constituency of Te Tai Tokerau.

References

Politics of New Zealand
Party switching
New Zealand English
Political terminology in New Zealand